Kiawah Island Golf Resort is a resort at Kiawah Island, South Carolina which is located along a  mix of island and beachfront property approximately   southwest of Charleston. Opened in May 1974

it consistently ranks as one of the country’s top resorts. 

The resort is home to The Sanctuary at Kiawah Island Golf Resort, a Forbes Five Star/AAA Five Diamond 255-room hotel and spa. The resort also manages nearly 500 private villas and homes and has more than a dozen restaurants. 

Best known for its golf courses, the resort also contains the Roy Barth Tennis Center, which features 22 tennis courts and is home to the Barth-Hawtin Tennis Academy.

Golf
Kiawah Island Golf Resort is home to five championship golf courses, most notably The Ocean Course, added in 1991.

The Ocean Course
The Ocean Course is the most famous course at Kiawah Island, and was designed by Pete and Alice Dye.  The course was designed so that players have a view of the shoreline of the Atlantic Ocean, but also to expose golfers to the often-strong winds in the area.  The Ocean Course has been consistently named as one of the best courses in the world by several publications such as Golf Digest and Golf Magazine as well as being named a "Certified Audubon Cooperative Sanctuary" by Audubon International. , the Ocean Course was rated 25th in Golf Digest'''s 100 Greatest Golf Courses in America.

Because of its large slopes, numerous bunkers, and challenging Bermuda grass, it was named the toughest course in America in 2010 by Golf Digest.

The Ocean Course was featured in the 2000 film The Legend of Bagger Vance. In October 2008, the Ocean Course became the first course to be available to play in the online video game that was developed by World Golf Tour.  Helicopters equipped with cameras and GPS tracking devices were used to photograph and record the entire course to produce a geographically accurate simulation.

Scorecard

Tournaments held
The Ocean Course first became well known in its first year when it hosted the Ryder Cup in 1991.  The United States team defeated Europe 14½–13½. The windy Ocean Course made for difficult playing conditions, and the United States team only won when Bernhard Langer of Germany missed a  par-saving putt that would have defeated Hale Irwin, tied the overall score at 14-all, and retained the cup for Europe.

In 1996, the Ocean Course hosted a match on Shell's Wonderful World of Golf between Annika Sörenstam and  Dottie Pepper. The course hosted the World Cup of Golf twice – in 1997 and in 2003. In 1997, Pádraig Harrington and Paul McGinley won the team title, with Colin Montgomerie winning the individual title. When the World Cup returned in 2003, Trevor Immelman and Rory Sabbatini won the team competition.

The Ocean Course hosted the PGA Club Professional Championship in 2005, won by Mike Small, the golf coach at the University of Illinois, with a score of 289. It also hosted the Senior PGA Championship in May 2007, when Denis Watson won his first golf tournament in twenty-three years, beating Eduardo Romero by two strokes.

The PGA Championship was played at the Ocean Course in August 2012 with Rory McIlroy winning by a record eight strokes. The championship returned to the Ocean Course in May 2021, and was won by Phil Mickelson, who became the oldest major champion in history at the age of 50.

Turtle Point
The Turtle Point course was designed by Jack Nicklaus and has also received accolades from Golf Digest'' magazine. Turtle Point has hosted regional tournaments such as the Carolina Amateur.

The Turtle Point course is a par 72 course. From the tournament tees, it measures  and has a slope rating of 73/134.

Osprey Point
The Osprey Point course at Kiawah Island was designed by Tom Fazio.

The Osprey point course is a par 72 course. It measures  from the tournament tees, and it has a slope rating of 72.8/135.

Oak Point
Designed by Clyde Johnston, the Oak Point course was purchased by the Kiawah Island Resort in 1997. He designed the course on former plantation lands that grew tomato and indigo.

Oak Point plays to a par of 72, and it measures  from the tournament tees with a slope rating of 71.9/130.

Cougar Point
The Cougar Point golf course was originally named Marsh Point, and Gary Player redesigned it in 1996. It is a par 72 course and from the tournament tees it measures  with a slope rating of 72.7/134.

Expansion 
Beginning spring 2018, Kiawah Island Golf Resort launched a three-year development that includes a new clubhouse at Cougar Point Golf Course, a non-denominational chapel at The Sanctuary, the West Beach Village Conference Center, a new villa check-in facility in West Beach, four cottages near The Ocean Course Clubhouse, and a complete renovation of Night Heron Park.

References

External links

 Unofficial Kiawah Island Visitors Guide: www.VisitKiawah.com

Buildings and structures in Charleston County, South Carolina
Golf clubs and courses designed by Pete Dye
Golf clubs and courses in South Carolina
Resorts in South Carolina
Tourist attractions in Charleston County, South Carolina
Ryder Cup venues